Kaysha (born 1974) is a singer/rapper and producer from the Democratic Republic of the Congo. He is the son of Congolese politician Édouard Mokolo Wa Mpombo.

Career
He was born in Kinshasa but emigrated to France with his parents at the age of seven. Kaysha's first single, which used a sample from French West Indian band Kassav's Oulé, was called "Bounce Baby".

Kaysha's second single was "Telephone", from his album I'm Ready. The next year, he changed his entire style to record a more urban album called Worldwidechico with a duo with Wu-Tang Clan's Killah Priest. One of his biggest single is the global African hit  "On dit quoi", from his album It's All Love, released on his own label Sushiraw in 2003. Some of his biggest hits are "Love de toi", "One Love", "Question my heart", "Fiona", "Musiquarian" and many more...

Kaysha is also a music producer. He produced songs for Passi, Solaar, Jacob Desvarieux, Soumia, Elizio, Ludo, Vanda May, Aycee Jordanu and others.

He produced huge hits for other artists like "Deeper" & "Rebound Chick" for Nelson Freitas, "I like it" for Abege, "Close your eyes" for Djodje, "Ceu" & "Love again" for C4 Pedro, and many more hits

Kaysha is one of the first African artist to have been nominated in the MTV Europe Awards in 2005 for Best African Artist

He won a Kora award for best African Artist in 2000. He won a Kora award for best African Artist of the Diaspora in 2004 and 2005.

Discography

Albums
2017 : African Prince
2014: Alien Blood
2013: Christmas Collection
2013: Raw Like Sushi
2013: The Best of Love
2012: The Night EP
2011: Works of art
2009: Forever Young
2008: Kinshasa B Boy
2006: Legendary
2005: African Bohemian
2003: It's all Love
2000: Worldwidechico
1999: Black Sea Of Love
1998: Bounce Baby

Covers
Be the one – 2018
God's plan – 2018
Rockstar – 2018
Shape of you – 2017
Stay – 2017
Passion fruit – 2017
Sexual Healing – 2015
Hotline bling – 2015
Hold On, We're Going Home – 2014
Drunk in Love – 2014
Diamonds – 2012
Human Nature – 2011

Performances with others
Dis l'heure de zouk – 2004
Kimberlite Zouk Love – 2004
Jocelin Demoumeaux's JDX – 2003
Jean Michel Rotin's Solo – 1997
X-Taz – 1996
Grand Maquis – 2005

As producer | Writer | Composer | Executive producer

 Juan Magan : Echa Pa Aca (feat. Pitbull & Rich the Kid) – 2018 (Writer)
 Blaya : Vem na vibe – 2018 (Writer)
Breyth : Supernova – 2018 (Writer, performer)
 No Maka feat. Blaya & Mc Zuka : Paula – 2017 (Writer)
 C4 Pedro : Ceu – 2016 (Producer)
 C4 Pedro & Sauti Sol – Love again – 2015 (Producer)
 Nelson Freitas : Life is Good – 2014 (Producer)
 Ricky Boy : Nem ceu nem mar (feat. Myriiam) – 2014 (Producer)
 Djodje : I won't stop the music – 2013 (Producer)
 William : Inside of you – 2013 (Producer)
 Aycee Jordan : You can't stop a revolution – 2012 (Producer, co-writer, executive producer)
 Vanda May : May Day – 2012 (Producer, co-writer, executive producer)
 Nelson Freitas : Rebound Chick – 2012 (Producer)
 Nelson Freitas : I just want my baby back – 2012 (Producer)
 Jamice : You – 2012 (Producer)
 Dannylys – I wanna do – 2012 (Producer, writer)
 Damogueez – I want it – 2012 (Producer)
 Ricky Boy : Eternamente – 2011 (Producer)
 Djodje : Bo e tudo feat. Chelsy Shantel – 2010 (Producer)
 Djodje : Close your eyes – 2010 (Producer)
 Nelson Freitas : Deeper – 2010 (Producer, co-writer)
 Nelson Freitas : Magia – 2010 (Producer)
 Loony Johnson : Backstage – 2009 (Producer, writer, executive producer)
Isah: Black Madonna – 2009 (Producer, co-writer, executive producer)
Kim : Feeling so good – 2009 (Producer, composer, writer)
Marysa : You make me sexy – 2009 (Producer, composer, writer)
Sandra Nanor : La seule Chose – 2009 (Producer, co-writer)
Thayna: Nouveau Depart – 2008 (Producer, co-writer, executive producer)
Mika Mendes: Mika Mendes – 2008 (Producer, co-writer, executive producer)
Neuza : Secretly loving you – 2008 (Producer)
Soumia: Confidences – 2008 (Producer, co-writer, executive producer)
Elizio: Confirmacao – 2008 (Producer, co-writer, executive producer)
Les Deesses – Saveurs Exotiques – 2007 (Producer, composer, writer)
Les Deesses – On a changé – 2007 (Producer, composer, writer)
Les Deesses – Danse avec moi – 2007 (Producer, composer, writer)
Princess Lover : C Comme – 2007 (Producer)
Abégé: C nou mem Again – 2007 (Producer, writer, executive producer)
Loony Johnson : Loony Johnson – 2006 (Producer, writer, executive producer)
Grand Maquis – 2005 (Producer, co-writer, executive producer)
Elizio: Carpe Diem – 2005 (Producer, co-writer, executive producer)
Soumia: In Love Again – 2005 (Producer, co-writer, executive producer)
SR.Dancehall2K4 – 2004 (Producer, co-writer, executive producer)
Teeyah: Métisse – 2004 (Producer, co-writer, executive producer)
Hot Caribbean Miziks – 2004 (Producer, co-writer, executive producer)
Elizio: Original di cabo verde – 2003 (Producer, co-writer, executive producer)
Abégé: C nou mem – 2003 (Producer, co-writer, executive producer)
Soumia: Still in Love – 2002 (Producer, co-writer, executive producer)
Shydeeh : I won't give up – 2001 (Producer, co-writer)
Shydeeh : The past (feat. Lynnsha) – 2001 (Producer, co-writer)
CaribbeanSoul – 2001 (Producer, co-writer, executive producer)

External links
 Kaysha's official label site
Kaysha's vlog (French & English)
 Kaysha's music on cdbaby (English)
 Kaysha's music on itunes (English)

Living people
Democratic Republic of the Congo emigrants to France
21st-century Democratic Republic of the Congo male singers
French rappers
Democratic Republic of the Congo producers
People from Kinshasa
1974 births